Fan Xianrong (born March 1963) is a Chinese diplomat who is the current , in office since March 2020. He served as Chinese Ambassador to Tajikistan from 2010 to 2015.

Biography
Fan was born in Chongqing, in March 1963 and graduated from Beijing Foreign Studies University. 

In 1992, he went to Kyiv, Ukraine to participate in the preparation for the establishment of the Chinese Embassy in Ukraine. He served as counsellor of the Embassy in the Russian Federation in 2001 and consul general in Khabarovsk in 2004. In 2008, he was appointed as counsellor of the General Office of the Ministry of Foreign Affairs of the People's Republic of China. The Chinese government appointed him Chinese Ambassador to Tajikistan in July 2010, and held that office until December 2015.

In 2015, he returned to China and that same year became director of the Foreign Affairs Office of Ningxia Hui Autonomous Region.

In 2017, he was sent to Russia again and was appointed envoy of the Chinese Embassy in the Russian Federation. In February 2020, he was appointed , replacing Du Wei.

References

1963 births
Living people
People from Chongqing
Beijing Foreign Studies University alumni
Diplomats of the People's Republic of China
Ambassadors of China to Tajikistan
Ambassadors of China to Ukraine